Melnikov Permafrost Institute of the Siberian Branch of the Russian Academy of Science is a research institute based in Yakutsk, Russia, a city built on continuous permafrost. It was founded in 1960.

In 2020, with global heating thawing the ground, the Institute is measuring the rate at which the permafrost is thawing, which affects the city as well as the climate.

Inventions
Method for Determining Air Content in Frozen Soil, Method and Apparatus for Determining Volume and Density of Soil Particles, Apparatus for Heat Exchange of Liquids and Gases, Method for Determining Frost Heave during Active Layer Freezeback, Pile for Permafrost, Device for Cooling Permafrost Soils, Method for Production of a Pile Foundation for Permafrost, Device for Stabilization of Indoor Temperature and other.

Divisions
 Laboratory of General Geocryology
 Laboratory of Permafrost Geothermics
 Laboratory of Permafrost Landscapes
 Laboratory of Permafrost Groundwater and Geochemistry
 Laboratory of Permafrost Engineering
 Geoinformatics Group
 Vilyui Permafrost Research Station
 North-Eastern Permafrost Station
 Igarka Geocryological Laboratory
 Kazakhstan Alpine Permafrost Laboratory

Cryo-storage
Cryo-storage of seeds of rare and promising plants was opened in 2012.

References

External links
 Melnikov Permafrost Institute of the Siberian Branch of the RAS. SB RAS.
 Indigenous Water Testing in Remote Russia. National Geographic.
 Russia’s River Villages: An Icy Grave. National Geographic.
 Melnikov Permafrost Institute. Lonely Planet.
 Melnikov Permafrost Institute (MPI), SB RAS. Nature Index.
 P.I. Melnikov Permafrost Institute, Siberian Branch of the Russian Academy of Sciences. ERA-LEARN 2020
 Members of the Permafrost Institute received RGO membership cards. Russian Geographical Society. Сотрудники Института мерзлотоведения получили членские билеты РГО. Русское географическое общество. 
  
  

Institutes of the Russian Academy of Sciences
Research institutes established in 1960
Research institutes in the Soviet Union
Science and technology in Siberia
Yakutsk
Permafrost
1960 establishments in the Soviet Union